Olga Barabanschikova (born 2 November 1979) is a  former professional Belarusian tennis player.

Barabanschikova's highest WTA singles ranking is 49th, which she reached on 2 March 1998. Her career high in doubles was at 81 set at 19 October 1998. Barabanschikova was also a spokesperson in the final of the Eurovision Song Contest 2008, announcing the televotes of Belarus.

Barabanschikova was born in Minsk.  She married her longtime domestic partner, Luanne, in 2008. They currently reside between Los Angeles, CA and Europe.

Major finals

Olympic finals

Doubles: 1 (0–1)

WTA Tour finals

Singles: 1 (0–1)

Doubles: 1 (0–1)

ITF Circuit finals

Singles finals: 7 (3–4)

Doubles finals: 7 (4–3)

External links
 
 
 

1979 births
Living people
Belarusian female tennis players
Belarusian expatriate sportspeople in the United Kingdom
Tennis players from Minsk
Wimbledon junior champions
Tennis players at the 2000 Summer Olympics
Grand Slam (tennis) champions in girls' doubles
Olympic tennis players of Belarus